Newa architecture is an indigenous style of architecture used by the Newari people in the Kathmandu valley in Nepal. It is a style used in buildings ranging from stupas and chaitya monastery buildings to courtyard structures and distinctive houses. The style is marked by striking brick work and a unique style of wood carving rarely seen outside Nepal. The style has been propagated by Nepalese architects including Arniko.

Pagoda temples 

A few of the most prominent Newari-style pagodas include:
 Chandeshwori Temple
 Changu Narayan Temple
 Kasthamandap Sattal
 Kathmandu Durbar Square - The nine storied Palace
 Kumbheshwar Temple
 Muktinath Temple
 Naradevi Temple
 Narayanhity Royal Palace
 Nhugha Dega Temple
 Nyatapola Temple
 Pashupatinath Temple
 Taleju Bhawani temple

See also 
 Bahal
 Newar window

Further reading
Slusser, Mary Shepherd. Nepal Mandala: A Cultural Study of the Kathmandu Valley (Two Volumes), Princeton University Press 1982. 
Pruscha, Carl. Kathmandu Valley - The Preservation of Physical Environment and Cultural Heritage - A Protective Inventory, Vol. 2, Wien 1975
Korn, Wolfgang. The Traditional Architecture of the Kathmandu Valley, Ratna Pustak Bhandar, Kathmandu, Nepal, 1979

 
Architectural styles